Goddess Africa, also known as Dea Africa, was the personification of Africa by the Romans in the early centuries of the common era. She was one of the fertility and abundance deities to some. Her iconography typically included an elephant-mask head dress, a cornucopia, a military standard, and a lion.  

To the Romans "Africa" was above all North Africa, which they had conquered, and the goddess/personification was not given African  characteristics; she was possibly thought of as Berber, but this cannot be judged in the great majority of representations.  This changed after she was revived in the Renaissance, by now clearly only the personification of Africa with no divine pretensions.

Roman use
She is portrayed on some coins, carved stones, and mosaics in Roman Africa. A mosaic of her is found in the El Djem museum of Tunisia. A sanctuary found in Timgad (Thamugadi in Berber) features goddess Africa's iconography.

She was one of a number of "province personifications" such as Britannia, Hispania, Macedonia and a number of Greek-speaking provinces.  Africa was one of the earliest to appear, and may have originated with the publicity around Pompey the Great's African triumph in 80 BC; some coins with both Pompey and Africa shown survive.

 
The elephant headdress is seen first on coins depicting Alexander the Great, commemorating his invasion of India, including the (possibly fake) "Porus medallions" issued during his lifetime and the coinage of Ptolemy I of Egypt issued from 319 to 294 BC. It may have had resonances with Pharaonic ideology. The image was later adopted on coinage of Agathocles of Syracuse minted around 304 BC, following his African Expedition. Subsequently it is seen on coinage of King Ibaras of Numidia, a kingdom that Pompey defeated in 1st century BCE, so very likely picked up from there by Pompey's image-makers.

Goddess
To the Romans the distinction between goddesses who received worship and personification figures understood to be literary and iconographic conveniences was very elastic, and Africa seems to have been on the boundary between the two. She was certainly not a major deity, but may have received some religious cult at times.. 

Pliny the Elder, in his book Natural Story, wrote "in Africa nemo destinat aliquid nisi praefatus Africam", which scholars translate as "no one in Africa does anything without first calling on Africa". This has been the literary proof of her existence and importance, in some cases interpreted as a proof for a North African goddess-centric cult. Other writers have also interpreted the female personification of Africa to be a "Dea" or goddess.

Maritz, however, has questioned whether personified Africa was ever a "Dea" or goddess to Romans, or anywhere else. The iconographic images of "Dea Africa" with elephant scalp head dress was just a Roman icon for Africa, states Maritz. This is likely because neither Pliny nor any writer thereafter ever wrote "Dea" for her, nor is there an epigraphical inscription stating "Dea Africa". In contrast, other Roman goddesses carry the prefix Dea in texts and inscriptions. Romans already had their own goddesses of fertility and abundance, states Maritz, and there was no need for a competing goddess with the same deity role.

Renaissance revival
In the Renaissance Africa was revived, along with other personifications, and was now, by the 17th century, usually given Dark colouring, curly hair, a broad nose, as well as her Roman attributes.  She was a necessary part of images of the Four Continents, which were popular in several media.

See also

 Bona Dea
 Ceres (mythology)
 Leticia
 Libera (mythology)
 Ops
 Terra (mythology)
 Vestal Virgin

References

Further reading
 Paul Corbier, Marc Griesheimer, L’Afrique romaine 146 av. J.-C.- 439 ap. J.-C. (Ellipses, Paris, 2005)

Religion in Africa
Roman goddesses
Africa (Roman province)
Personifications in Roman mythology
National personifications
Personifications of continents
Lion deities